The Antes, or Antae, were an early East Slavic tribal polity of the 6th century CE. They lived on the lower Danube River, in the northwestern Black Sea region (present-day Moldova and central Ukraine), and in the regions around the Don River (in Middle and Southern Russia). Scholars commonly associate the Antes with the archaeological Penkovka culture.

First mentioned in the historical record in 518, the Antes invaded the Diocese of Thrace sometime between the years of 533 and 545. Thereafter, they became Byzantine foederati and received gold payments and a fort (named "Turris" - the Latin word turris means 'tower') somewhere north of the Danube at a strategically important location to prevent hostile barbarians from invading Roman lands. Thus from 545 to the 580s, Antean soldiers fought in various Byzantine campaigns. The Pannonian Avars attacked the Antes at the beginning of the 7th century, when the Antes disappeared as a group and became ancestors of both the East Slavs and South Slavs.

Customs

The Antes had similar if not identical customs and culture as the Sclaveni. They were carefully described by chroniclers such as Procopius and Maurice, whose works contribute greatly to our understanding of these two early Slavic peoples. 

Maurice writes that the Slavs were very hospitable people, and tribes that mistreated guests were attacked for their dishonor. Prisoners were not kept forever and after a certain period of time, captives were allowed to be let loose or to join the community. Settlements were built in hard to reach forests, lakes and marshes as they were hard to attack, with exits in many directions for escape. They farmed many crops, especially millet, but also had much livestock. Maurice praises their toleration of discomfort when necessary, and the loyalty of married women to their husbands. The Antes and Sclaveni were independent, refusing to be governed or enslaved.  They lived under democracy, with all matters being referred to the people.

The religion of the Antes, like that of other Slavic tribes and peoples, was Slavic paganism. 

The Antes and Sclaveni were skilled warriors, especially in guerrilla warfare, taking advantage of terrain. They preferred to fight in dense woodland instead of pitched battle, although field battles and sieges were also recorded. Their weapons were javelins, spears, bows nocked with poison-tipped arrows and sturdy wooden shields, but body armour was rare.

Historiography

Scholars have studied the Antes since the late 18th century. Based on the literary evidence provided by Procopius (c. 500–560 CE) and Jordanes (fl. c. 551), the Antes, along with the Sclaveni and the Venethi, have long been viewed as the constituent proto-Slavic peoples ancestral to both medieval Slavic ethnicities and modern Slavic nations. At times, debate over the origins and the descendants of the Antes has been heated. The tribe has been variously regarded as the ancestors of, specifically, the Vyatichi or the Rus (from a medieval perspective), and, in terms of extant populations, of the Ukrainians versus other East Slavs. Additionally, South Slavic historians have regarded the Antes as the ancestors of the eastern South Slavs.

Ethnolinguistic affinities

Although the Antes are regarded as a predominantly Slavic tribal union, numerous other theories of their ethnic components have arisen. The origins of their core ruling class have drawn particular attention, including theories that this ruling nobility was ethnically Iranic, Gothic, Slavic, or some mixture thereof. Much of this dispute has arisen from the scantness of the literary evidence: little is known of the Antes apart from the tribal name itself and a handful of anthroponyms. The name Antes itself does not appear to be Slavic, and is often held to be an Iranian word. Omeljan Pritsak, citing Max Vasmer, argues that because anta- means "frontier, end" in Sanskrit, *ant-ya could mean "frontiersman" or "that which is at the end"; and in Ossetian att'iya means "the last, behind". F.P. Filin and Oleg Trubachyov shared this opinion. In contrast, Bohdan Struminskyj considered the etymology of Antes unproven and "irrelevant". Struminskyj analyzed the personal names of Antean chiefs and offered Germanic etymological alternatives to the commonly accepted Slavic etymologies that had first been proposed by Stanisław Rospond.

Although the first unequivocal attestation of the Antes tribe is from the 6th century CE, scholars (e.g. Vernadsky) have tried to connect the Antes with a tribe rendered as Yancai 奄蔡 (< LHC *ʔɨamA-sɑC < OC (125 BCE) *ʔɨam-sɑs; compare Latin Abzoae, identified with the Aorsi (Ancient Greek Αορσιοι)) in the Records of the Grand Historian, a 2nd-century-BCE Chinese source. Pliny the Elder mentions some Anti living near the shores of the Azov Sea, and inscriptions from the Kerch peninsula dating to the 3rd century CE bear the word antas. Based on documentation of "Sarmatian" tribes inhabiting the north Pontic region during the early centuries of the Common Era, presumed Iranic loanwords in Slavic languages, and Sarmatian "cultural borrowings" into the Penkovka culture, scholars such as Paul Robert Magocsi, Valentin Sedov, and John V.A. Fine, Jr. maintain earlier proposals by Soviet-era scholars such as Boris Rybakov, that the Antes were originally a Sarmatian–Alan frontier tribe that become Slavicized but preserved their name. Sedov argues that the ethnonym referred to the Slavic–Scythian–Sarmatian population living between the Dniester and Dnieper Rivers, and later to the related Slavic tribes who emerged from this Slavic–Iranian symbiosis.

However, more-recent perspectives view the tribal entities named by Graeco-Roman sources as fluctuant political formations that were, above all, etic categorizations based on ethnographic stereotypes rather than on first-hand, accurate knowledge of the barbarian language or "culture." Bartłomiej Szymon Szmoniewski argues that the Antes were not a "discrete, ethnically homogeneous entity" but rather "a highly complex political reality". Linguistically, contemporary evidence suggests that Proto-Slavic was the common language of an area that extended from the eastern Alps to the Black Sea and was spoken by peoples of varying ethnic backgrounds, including Slavs, provincial Romans, Germanic tribes (such as the Gepids and Lombards), and Turkic peoples (such as the Avars and Bulgars). It has further been proposed that the Sklaveni were not distinguished from others on the basis of language or culture but on that of military organization. Compared with the Avars, or 6th-century Goths, the Sklaveni were composed of numerous, smaller disunited groups, one of which – the Antai – became foederati constituted by a treaty.

History

Early history

According to historians who argue for a connection between the Antes and the Sarmatians, the Antes were a subgroup of the Alans, who dominated the Black Sea and North Caucasus region during the Late Sarmatian Period. The Antes were based between the Bug and lower Dnieper in the 1st–2nd centuries CE. In the 4th century, their center of power shifted northward toward the southern Bug. In the 5th and 6th centuries, they settled in Volhynia and subsequently in the middle Dnieper region near the present-day city of Kyiv. As they moved north from the open steppe to the forest steppe, they organized the Slavic tribes, and the name Antes came to be used for the mixed Slavo–Alanic polity.

Whatever the exact origins of the tribe, Jordanes and Procopius both appear to suggest that the Antes were Slavic by the 5th century. In describing the lands of Scythia, Jordanes states that "the populous race of the Venethi occupy a great expanse of land. Though their names are now dispersed amid various clans and places, yet they are chiefly called Sklaveni and Antes." Later, in describing the deeds of Ermanaric, the mythical Ostrogothic king, Jordanes writes that the Venethi "have now three names: Venethi, Antes, and Sklaveni". Finally, he describes a battle between the Antean king Boz and Ermanaric's successor Vinitharius after the latter's subjugation by the Huns. After initially defeating the Goths, the Antes lost the second battle, and Boz and 70 of his leading nobles were crucified (Get. 247). Scholars have traditionally taken the accounts of Jordanes as face-value evidence that the Sklaveni and (the bulk of the) Antes descended from the Venedi, a tribe known to historians such as Tacitus, Ptolemy, and Pliny the Elder since the 2nd century CE.

However, the utility of Getica as an accurate work of ethnography has been questioned. Walter Goffart, for example, argues that Getica created an entirely mythical story of Gothic and other peoples' origins. Florin Curta further argues that Jordanes had no real ethnographic knowledge of "Scythia," despite claims that he himself was a Goth and was born in Thrace. He borrowed heavily from earlier historians and only artificially linked the 6th-century Sklaveni and Antes with the earlier Venethi, who had otherwise long disappeared by that century. This anachronism was paired with a "modernizing narrative strategy" whereby Jordanes retold older events – the war between the Ostrogothic Vithimiris and the Alans – as a war between Vinitharius and the contemporary Antes. In any case, no 4th-century source mentions the Antes, and the "Ostrogoths" did not form until the 5th century – inside the Balkans.

Apart from the influence of older historians, Jordanes' narrative style was shaped by his polemical debate with his contemporary Procopius. While Jordanes linked the Sclaveni and Antes with the ancient Venedi, Procopius states that they were both once called Sporoi.

Location in 6th century

Jordanes and Procopius have been seen as invaluable sources in locating the Antes with greater precision. Jordanes (Get. 25) states that they dwelt "along the curve of the Black Sea" from the Dniester to the Dnieper. Paul M. Barford questions whether this implies they occupied the steppe or the regions further north, although most scholars generally place the Antes in the forest steppe zone of right-bank Ukraine. In contrast, Procopius locates them just beyond the northern banks of the Danube (Wars V 27.1–2) (i.e., Wallachia). The lack of consistency in geography demonstrates that the Antes stretched well across Sarmatian Scythia, rather than being a small and distant polity.

6th and 7th centuries

The first contact between the Eastern Romans and the Antes was in 518 CE. Recorded by Procopius, the Antean raid appeared to coincide with the Vitalian' revolt, but was intercepted and defeated by the magister militum per Thraciam Germanus. Germanus was replaced by Chilbudius in the early 530s, who was killed three years later during an expedition against the various Sklavenoi. With the death of Chilbudius, Justinian appears to have changed his policy against Slavic barbarians from offense to defense, exemplified by his grand program of refortifying garrisons along the Danube.
Procopius notes that in 539–40, the Sklavenes and Antes "became hostile to one another and engaged in battle," probably encouraged by the Romans' traditional tactic of "divide and conquer." At the same time, the Romans recruited mounted mercenaries from both groups to aid their war against the Ostrogoths. Nevertheless, both Procopius and Jordanes report numerous raids by "Huns," Slavs, Bulgars, and Antes in the years 539–40 CE, reporting that some 32 forts and 120,000 Roman prisoners were captured. Sometime between 533 and 545, the Antes invaded the Diocese of Thrace, enslaving many Romans and taking them north of the Danube to the Antean homelands. Indeed, numerous raids were conducted during this turbulent decade by numerous barbarian groups, including the Antes.

Shortly afterward, the Antes became Roman allies (after approaching the Romans) and were given gold payments and a fort named "Turris" somewhere north of the Danube at a strategically important location, in order to prevent hostile barbarians invading Roman lands. This was part of a larger set of alliances, including the Lombards, lifting pressure off the lower Danube and enabling forces to be diverted to Italy. Thus, in 545, Antean soldiers were fighting in Lucania against Ostrogoths, and in the 580s they attacked the settlements of the Sklavenes at the behest of the Romans. In 555 and 556, Dabragezas (of Antean origin) led the Roman fleet in Crimea against Persian positions.

The Antes remained Roman allies until their demise in the first decade of the 7th century. They were often involved in conflicts with the Avars, such as the war recorded by Menander the Guardsman (50, frg 5.3.17–21) in the 560s. In 602, in retaliation for a Roman attack on their Sklavene allies, the Avars sent their general Apsich to "destroy the nation of the Antes."
Despite numerous defections to the Romans during the campaign, the Avar attack appears to have ended the Antean polity. They never again appear in sources, apart from the epithet Anticus in the imperial titulature in 612. Curta argues that the 602 attack on the Antes destroyed their political independence. However, based on the aforementioned attestation of Anticus, Georgios Kardaras rather argues that the disappearance of the Antes stemmed from the general collapse of the Scythian/lower Danubian limes they defended, ending their hegemony on the lower Danube. Others have seen a remote connection between the demise of the Antes and the oppression of the Dulebes by the Avars mentioned in the Primary Chronicle, and/or the tradition recorded by Al-Masudi and Abraham ben Jacob that in ancient times the Walitābā (which some read as Walīnānā and identified with the Volhynians) were "the original, pure-blooded Saqaliba, the most highly honoured" and dominated the rest of the Slavic tribes, but due to "dissent" their "original organization was destroyed" and "the people divided into factions, each of them ruled by their own king", implying existence of a Slavic federation which perished after the attack of the Avars. Whatever the case, shortly after the collapse of the Danubian limes (more specifically, the tactical Roman withdrawal), the first evidence of Slavic settlement in northeastern Bulgaria begin to appear.

The Pereshchepina hoard, dating to the early 7th century, may be considered part of an Antean chieftain's treasury, although most researchers consider it to be the treasure of Khan Kubrat, the first ruler of Old Great Bulgaria.

Aftermath

Out of the old Antes federation, some of the following tribes are assumed to have evolved:

Croats, north of the Carpathian Mountains in Prykarpattia (and Zakarpattia)
Drevlyans, between the Pripet and Horyn Rivers
Dulebes, in Volhynia between the Vistula, Buh, and Styr Rivers
Polans, between Kyiv and Roden
Severians, along the Desna and upper Seim and Sula Rivers
Tiverians, along the Dniester River
Ulichians, between Dniester and Dnieper in the forest-steppe zone

However, their association with Antes, like in the case of Croats, is often unclear and not critical enough regarding various scientific evidence of the migration period. The tribes living in Western Ukraine (Croats, Buzhans, Drevlians, Polans, Tivertsi, Ulichs and Volhynians) are considered to be between 7th and 10th century part of the Luka-Raikovets culture, which developed from Prague-Korchak culture and not Prague-Penkovka culture related to Antes.

Rulers

Boz (fl. 376–80), king of Antae and first known Slavic ruler
 (fl. 555–56), led Roman fleet in Crimea against Persian positions
Idariz, or Idarisius (fl. 562), father of Mezamir
Mezamir (fl. 562), powerful Antae archon
Kelagast (fl. 562), brother of Mezamir
Musokios, or Mužok (fl. 592), Antes monarch
Ardagast (fl. 584–97), commander and chieftain of Musokios
Pirogast

See also

Sclaveni
List of ancient Slavic peoples
Martynivka Treasure

Notes

Citations

Sources
 
 
 
 
 
 
 
 
 
 
 
 
 
 
 
 
 
 
 
 

 415 pages

Further reading
 Kardaras, Georgios. "Sclaveni and Antes. Some Notes on the Peculiarities Between Them". In: Slavia Orientalis Vol. LXVII, n. 3 (2018): 377-393.

Medieval Ukraine
Sarmatian tribes
History of Moldavia
6th century in Romania
7th century in Romania
Early Slavs
East Slavic tribes
Barbarian kingdoms
Ancient Slavs